Weetwood is a ward in the metropolitan borough of the City of Leeds, West Yorkshire, England.  It contains 78 listed buildings that are recorded in the National Heritage List for England.  Of these, four are listed at Grade II*, the middle of the three grades, and the others are at Grade II, the lowest grade.  The ward is to the northwest of the centre of Leeds, and includes the suburbs of Far Headingley, Ireland Wood, Tinshill, Weetwood and West Park.  It is mainly residential, and most of the listed buildings are houses, some large and divided into smaller units, with associated structures.  The ward also includes Leeds Beckett University, many of whose buildings are listed.  The other listed buildings include a column originally in a church, shops, a public house, a horse trough, churches, a meter house, a former hospital, a post box, and a war memorial.


Key

Buildings

References

Citations

Sources

 

Lists of listed buildings in West Yorkshire